The Sundsvall Central Station (Swedish: Sundsvalls centralstation) is an historic railway station in Sundsvall, Sweden. It was designed by architect Folke Zettervall and opened December 17, 1925.

The station is owned by Jernhusen.

Services

References

Railway stations in Västernorrland County
Railway stations opened in 1925